Hi! Dharma 2: Showdown in Seoul (lit. "Hey Dharma, Let's Go to Seoul") is a 2004 South Korean gangster comedy film. It is the sequel to Hi! Dharma! (2001).

Plot
In order to deliver a package for their recently departed head monk, Jeong-myeong, Hyeon-gak and Dae-bong travel to Musim-sa Temple in Seoul, in their first contact with civilization in years. But they find Musim-sa in financial trouble and in danger of being taken over by Beom-shik and his gangsters, who plan to build an apartment complex on the land. The monk trio have no choice but to stay in the city to protect the temple, and ready themselves for another showdown.

Cast
Shin Hyun-joon as Beom-shik
Jung Jin-young as Monk Jeong-myeong
Lee Won-jong as monk Hyeon-gak
Lee Moon-sik as monk Dae-bong
Yang Jin-woo as monk Mu-jin
Yoo Hae-jin as Yong-dae
Kim Seok-hwan as Sang-geun
Lee Hyung-chul as Gu-man
Kim Ji-young as Elder bosal
Jung Han-yong as Company president Park
Han Hye-jin as Mi-seon
Park Gun-tae as Boy monk
Choi Min-kum as Kimbap ajumma
Park Gyeong-ok as Boutique designer Jung
Lee Ye-won as Jae-gyu's wife
Park Shin-yang as Jae-gyu (cameo)

References

External links

South Korean action comedy films
2003 films
Films about Buddhism
Buddhism in Korea
2000s South Korean films